Stanisław Wojciech Mikke (11 September 1947 in Łódź – 10 April 2010) was a Polish lawyer. He was Deputy Head of the Council for the Protection of Struggle and Martyrdom Sites.

He died in the 2010 Polish Air Force Tu-154 crash near Smolensk on 10 April 2010. He was posthumously awarded the Order of Polonia Restituta.

References

1947 births
2010 deaths
Lawyers from Łódź
University of Warsaw alumni
Knights of the Order of Polonia Restituta
Commanders with Star of the Order of Polonia Restituta
Burials at Powązki Military Cemetery
Victims of the Smolensk air disaster